1 Corinthians 8 is the eighth chapter of the First Epistle to the Corinthians in the New Testament of the Christian Bible. It is authored by Paul the Apostle and Sosthenes in Ephesus. In this short chapter, Paul deals with an issue about food offered to idols.

Text
The original text was written in Koine Greek. This chapter is divided into 13 verses.

Textual witnesses
Some early manuscripts containing the text of this chapter in Greek are:
Papyrus 129 (mid 2nd century; extant verses 10–13)
Papyrus 15 (3rd century; extant verses 1–4)
Codex Vaticanus (325–350)
Codex Sinaiticus (330–360)
Codex Alexandrinus (400–440)

Food offered to idols
At the Apostolic Council of Jerusalem, reported in Acts 15, following advice offered by Simon Peter (Acts 15:7–11 and Acts 15:14), Barnabas and Paul gave an account of their ministry among the gentiles (Acts 15:12), and the apostle James quoted from the words of the prophet Amos (Acts 15:16–17), quoting Amos 9:11–12. James added his own words to the quotation: "Known to God from eternity are all His works", and then submitted a proposal, which was accepted by the Church and became known as the Apostolic Decree:

Here, Paul makes no reference to the Apostolic Decree, advising members of the Corinthian church that we all know that food offered to idols is a meaningless concept – "we know that an idol is nothing in the world" – but its consumption is capable of leading to misunderstanding. Protestant theologian Heinrich Meyer argues that this omission "is in keeping with [Paul's] consciousness of his own direct and independent apostolic dignity".

Verse 9 

 "But beware lest somehow" (KJV: "But take heed lest by any means"): referring to such as argued in favor of eating things offered to idols, or else a limitation and explanation of the apostle's own concession, that it made a man, with respect to God, neither better nor worse, but nonetheless need to be cautious not to cause harm.
 "A stumbling block": It could be the means of offending, or causing to offend, for those were weak in the faith, not having the proper knowledge of Christian liberty, so it should be guarded against abuse, because even though the action itself was indifferent, it might be used to cause wrongdoings.

See also 
 Idol
 Idolatry in Judaism
 Idolatry in Christianity
 Idolatry in the Bible
 Related Bible parts: Matthew 18, Acts 15, Romans 14, 1 Corinthians 9

References

Further reading

External links 
 King James Bible - Wikisource
English Translation with Parallel Latin Vulgate
Online Bible at GospelHall.org (ESV, KJV, Darby, American Standard Version, Bible in Basic English)
Multiple bible versions at Bible Gateway (NKJV, NIV, NRSV etc.)

08